Lysyl oxidase homolog 3 is an enzyme that in humans is encoded by the LOXL3 gene.

This gene encodes a member of the lysyl oxidase gene family. The prototypic member of the family is essential to the biogenesis of connective tissue, encoding an extracellular copper-dependent amine oxidase that catalyses the first step in the formation of crosslinks in collagens and elastin. A highly conserved amino acid sequence at the C-terminus end appears to be sufficient for amine oxidase activity, suggesting that each family member may retain this function. The N-terminus is poorly conserved and may impart additional roles in developmental regulation, senescence, tumor suppression, cell growth control, and chemotaxis to each member of the family. Alternatively spliced transcript variants of this gene have been reported but their full-length nature has not been determined.

Clinical significance 

An autosomal recessive mutation (missense variant) in the LOXL3 gene is one of the causes of Stickler syndrome, a disease where collagen is not crosslinked properly. Common features are high myopia and cleft palate due to arthropathy (joint pathology) and vitreoretinopathy (pathology of the eye).

See also 
 LOXL1
 LOXL2
 LOXL4

References

Further reading

Lysyl oxidases